Clementi Bus Interchange is an air-conditioned bus interchange in Clementi New Town, beside Clementi MRT station. It is located at the junction of Clementi Avenue 3 and Commonwealth Avenue West, situated within the Clementi Mall and integrated with Clementi MRT station. This interchange serves mainly commuters travelling to the various housing estates, schools, recreational areas, healthcare centres and places of worship in Clementi and West Coast.

History
The interchange was first opened on 16 November 1980 by Chor Yeok Eng, Senior Parliamentary Secretary for Environment and Member of Parliament for Bukit Timah. It was a long covered walkway structure with queue railings and berths at the side of the road, leading many people to call it a "roadside bus terminal" resembling the interchanges built in the 1970s.

Operations then moved to the temporary facility built across the road at the junction of Commonwealth Avenue West and Clementi Avenue 3 (Land Lot MK05-08585W) on 29 October 2006. This facility was a blue-red-white structure that resembles the original interchange and was used for 5 years and 27 days while the original site was redeveloped into what is known as the new Clementi Town Centre that was planned by HDB which consisted of a new air-conditioned bus interchange, Clementi Mall and 2 HDB flats (Clementi Towers).

The current interchange is an 8,100 square meter facility that opened on 26 November 2011. It is the 6th air conditioned bus interchange in Singapore. Together with Clementi and the nearby commercial developments, it is part of the Clementi Integrated Public Transport Hub.

Bus Contracting Model

As the winning bidder for Bulim Bus Package is under the bus contracting model in 2015, Tower Transit took over operations for services 96, 173, 282, 284 and 285 from SBS Transit and SMRT Buses in June 2016. Despite Tower Transit operating the feeder bus services from Clementi, SBS Transit is still the principal operator, operating a majority of bus services included in three bus packages. Clementi, Bedok and Sengkang-Hougang.

Under the new bus contracting model, all the bus routes were split into 4 route packages. Bus Services 96, 173, 282, 284 and 285 are under Bulim Bus Package, Bus Service 165 is under Sengkang-Hougang Bus Package, Bus Services 14 and 196 are under Bedok Bus Package and the rest of the bus services are under Clementi Bus Package.

Currently, Bus Services 96, 173, 282, 284 and 285 (Bulim Bus Package) are currently operated by Tower Transit Singapore. All remaining bus services are operated by the anchor operator, SBS Transit.

List of routes

References

External links
 Interchanges and Terminals (SBS Transit)
 Interchange/Terminal (SMRT Buses)

2011 establishments in Singapore
Bus stations in Singapore
Clementi